Donald G. Beneke (14 March 1916 – 17 February 1990) was an American lawyer and politician.

Beneke was born to parents Anton and Theresa Mefferd Beneke in Laurens, Iowa, on 14 March 1916. He attended high school in his hometown. After graduating in 1933, Beneke attended the University of Iowa and its College of Law, completing his bachelor's degree in 1937, and a Juris Doctor in 1939. Beneke had six siblings, including Raymond Beneke, an economist and professor at Iowa State University.

Donald Beneke was associated with the Laurens school board from 1947 to 1961, as secretary, regular member, and later president. Between 1951 and 1954, he was district attorney for Pocahontas County. Beneke was nominated in April 1961 as the Republican candidate for a special election to the Iowa Senate the following month, defeated Democratic candidate James Hamilton in the election, and duly took office in District 50 on 4 May 1961. In November 1962, Beneke won a full term in District 37. After stepping down from the state legislature in 1965, Beneke served as president of the Pocahontas County Board of Education and contested a seat on the Area 5 Education Agency in 1974. By 1980, Beneke had been designated mental health referee for Pocahontas County. At the time of his death at Pocahontas Community Hospital on 17 February 1990, Beneke was director of the Laurens State Bank and serving as Laurens city attorney.

References

1916 births
1990 deaths
People from Laurens, Iowa
Iowa state senators
District attorneys in Iowa
Iowa city attorneys
20th-century American lawyers
20th-century American politicians
School board members in Iowa
University of Iowa College of Law alumni